Rapone is a town and comune in the province of Potenza, in the region of Basilicata. It is bounded by the comuni of Calitri (AV), Castelgrande, Pescopagano, Ruvo del Monte, San Fele.

Cities and towns in Basilicata